Francis A. Pallotti (August 21, 1886 – December 21, 1946) was an American politician who served as the Secretary of the State of Connecticut from 1923 to 1929 and as the Attorney General of Connecticut from 1939 to 1945. 

A Republican from Hartford, Connecticut, Pallotti received his BA from the College of the Holy Cross in 1908 and his JD from Yale Law School in 1911. He also served as a judge of the Hartford city police court from 1917 to 1921.

References

1886 births
1946 deaths
Politicians from Hartford, Connecticut
20th-century American politicians
Secretaries of the State of Connecticut
Connecticut Attorneys General
Connecticut Republicans